Altovis is a herbal supplement. Its main active ingredients are caffeine and ginseng. Altovis is produced and sold by Berkeley Premium Nutraceuticals (best known for Enzyte), initially via subsidiary Wagner Nutraceuticals.

Overview
When originally introduced, the active ingredients in Altovis were green tea leaf extract (provides caffeine), cordyceps extract (mycelium), Eleutherococcus (Siberian ginseng), vinpocetine (from vocanga tree seeds), and octacosanol. It also contains the following other ingredients: Dicalcium phosphate, microcrystalline cellulose, croscarmellose sodium, stearic acid, silica, magnesium stearate, and film coat (hypromellose, hydroxypropyl cellulose, polyethylene glycol, propylene glycol, titanium dioxide, FD&C yellow #6 lake, riboflavin, FD&C blue #2 lake).

, the active ingredients—green tea leaf extract (provides 100 mg caffeine and 350 mg polyphenols), Eleuthero root 12:1 extract (equivalent to 2000 mg eleuthero root), Korean ginseng root 5:1 extract (Panax ginseng), and Octacosanol—have been the same since at least late 2006. The new formula has the same other ingredients, except silica is now listed after magnesium stearate.

References

External links
Official Website
Aggieland Supplements
Benefits of BCAA Supplements

Biologically-based therapies